Polish People's Party (PSL) was a political party in Czechoslovakia founded in autumn 1922, based amongst Polish middle-class Protestants. The chairman of the party was doctor Jan Buzek. Other prominent party activists were pastor Józef Berger and journalist Jarosław Waleczko. In the 1929 parliamentary election, Buzek was elected member of parliament. He joined the Czechoslovak Social Democratic parliamentary group. The party published the weekly newspaper Ewangelik from Český Těšín (Czeski Cieszyn) and Prawo ludu as a party newspaper.

Footnotes

References 
 

Interwar minority parties in Czechoslovakia
Protestant political parties
Political parties established in 1922
Polish minority in Zaolzie
Polish People's Party
1922 establishments in Czechoslovakia
Political parties disestablished in 1937
1937 disestablishments in Europe